Darroll Lamont Wilson (born June 8, 1966) is an American former professional boxer who competed from 1993 to 2006. He is best known for his gutsy performances against some of the best fighters of his day, and his upset third-round TKO win over Shannon Briggs. He also beat contenders James Pritchard and Bert Cooper.

Professional boxing career
Known as "Doin' Damage", Wilson was a prospect early in his professional career. He had just one amateur fight; a points loss to Tongan Samson Po'uha in 1992. 

After 13 wins and a draw, he fought another unbeaten prospect in Terry McGroom light-heavy Golden Gloves champ. Wilson and McGroom fought to a ten-round draw.

In Wilson's next fight he outpointed an unbeaten heavyweight in James Stanton.

Briggs, Tua & Tshabalala fights
In 1996, he competed in HBO's "Night of the Young Heavyweights". His unbeaten opponent, 25-0 Shannon Briggs was an amateur star and being touted as a future champ, he was the main feature of the card. In a huge upset,  Wilson took Briggs best shots in the opening rounds, turned the tide in the second, then knocked Briggs out for the full count in the third. This is considered by many to be the highlight of Wilson's career. Briggs for a while had the reputation to be "chinny" but wasn't knocked down by George Foreman, reputedly among the greatest punchers in history.

Later that year, 1996, Wilson was brought back to HBO to meet another undefeated top-prospect, the Samoan born, New Zealand Olympic bronze medallist David Tua, who had also won on the previous "young heavys" card. After two minutes of give-and-take the hard hitting Tua KO'ed Wilson in the first round with his lethal left hook.

Wilson had lost, but was still a semi-attraction, and got his second chance when he met once-beaten South African Courage Tshabalala. The two staged one of the most famous fights of the year 1997. In the first round Courage dropped Wilson with a stiff left jab 25 seconds into the fight. Things looked even worse for Wilson when he was dropped again in the third, this time much harder, with a right hand. Courage tried to finish in the fourth but Wilson fought back with the heart he showed in the Briggs fight and leveled his opponent for the count.

Decline
Wilson's next big fight was an upset loss to Terrence Lewis by fifth-round TKO in 1998. Lewis was a tough and dangerous fighter with a respected right hand, however, the result was still a surprise. Wilson was no longer a fringe contender and dropped to journeyman status.

Wilson was again TKO'ed in his next fight to the hard hitting contender and Olympic silver medallist David Izon. In that fight, Wilson's own power surfaced early, and Izon was dropped in the first round, but Wilson couldn't finish the job.

Since then he slipped dramatically and never regained his old form. In 1999 he lost fights to Frankie Swindell and Zuri Lawrence, and was stopped in two rounds by the bigger and more experienced 2-time heavyweight champion Tim Witherspoon.

Wilson dropped a ten-round decision to Jean-Francois Bergeron and Ray Mercer in 2005 and was stopped inside 4 rounds by Oliver McCall in 2006. Wilson's last professional fight was on December 2, 2006.

Professional boxing record

|-
|align="center" colspan=8|27 Wins (21 knockouts, 6 decisions), 10 Losses (7 knockouts, 3 decisions), 2 Draws 
|-
| align="center" style="border-style: none none solid solid; background: #e3e3e3"|Result
| align="center" style="border-style: none none solid solid; background: #e3e3e3"|Record
| align="center" style="border-style: none none solid solid; background: #e3e3e3"|Opponent
| align="center" style="border-style: none none solid solid; background: #e3e3e3"|Type
| align="center" style="border-style: none none solid solid; background: #e3e3e3"|Round
| align="center" style="border-style: none none solid solid; background: #e3e3e3"|Date
| align="center" style="border-style: none none solid solid; background: #e3e3e3"|Location
| align="center" style="border-style: none none solid solid; background: #e3e3e3"|Notes
|-align=center
|Loss
|28–9–2
|align=left| Sedreck Fields
|KO
|7
|02/12/2006
|align=left| Saint Charles, Missouri, U.S.
|align=left|
|-
|Loss
|28–8–2
|align=left| Oliver McCall
|TKO
|4
|09/09/2006
|align=left| Louisville, Kentucky, U.S.
|align=left|
|-
|Loss
|28–7–2
|align=left| Ray Mercer
|UD
|10
|24/06/2005
|align=left| Atlantic City, New Jersey, U.S.
|align=left|
|-
|Loss
|28–6–2
|align=left| Jean-Francois Bergeron
|UD
|10
|07/03/2003
|align=left| Niagara Falls, Ontario, Canada
|align=left|
|-
|Win
|28–5–2
|align=left| Bert Cooper
|RTD
|4
|20/09/2002
|align=left| Philadelphia, Pennsylvania, U.S.
|align=left|
|-
|Loss
|27–5–2
|align=left| Tim Witherspoon
|KO
|2
|10/03/2002
|align=left| Henderson, Nevada, U.S.
|align=left|
|-
|Win
|27–4–2
|align=left| Frankie Hines
|KO
|1
|05/10/2001
|align=left| Virginia Beach, Virginia, U.S.
|align=left|
|-
|Win
|26–4–2
|align=left| Mike Rouse
|TKO
|5
|28/04/2001
|align=left| Atlantic City, New Jersey, U.S.
|align=left|
|-
|Win
|25–4–2
|align=left| Ric Lainhart
|KO
|1
|13/04/2001
|align=left| Hampton, Virginia, U.S.
|align=left|
|-
|Win
|24–4–2
|align=left| David Willis
|TKO
|4
|27/02/2001
|align=left| Indianapolis, Indiana, U.S.
|align=left|
|-
|Loss
|23–4–2
|align=left| Zuri Lawrence
|UD
|10
|02/09/1999
|align=left| Saratoga Springs, New York, U.S.
|align=left|
|-
|Loss
|23–3–2
|align=left| Frankie Swindell
|TKO
|5
|01/07/1999
|align=left| Tunica, Mississippi, U.S.
|align=left|
|-
|Win
|22–3–2
|align=left| Don Normand
|TKO
|2
|20/05/1999
|align=left| Tunica, Mississippi, U.S.
|align=left|
|-
|Loss
|21–3–2
|align=left| David Izon
|KO
|4
|14/11/1998
|align=left| Ledyard, Connecticut, U.S.
|align=left|
|-
|Win
|21–2–2
|align=left| Anthony Willis
|TKO
|5
|12/06/1998
|align=left| Baton Rouge, Louisiana, U.S.
|align=left|
|-
|Loss
|20–2–2
|align=left| Terrence Lewis
|TKO
|5
|03/02/1998
|align=left| Philadelphia, Pennsylvania, U.S.
|align=left|
|-
|Win
|20–1–2
|align=left| James Pritchard
|TKO
|2
|29/11/1997
|align=left| Vineland, New Jersey, U.S.
|align=left|
|-
|Win
|19–1–2
|align=left| Courage Tshabalala
|KO
|4
|03/06/1997
|align=left| Philadelphia, Pennsylvania, U.S.
|align=left|
|-
|Win
|18–1–2
|align=left| Ron McCarthy
|TKO
|6
|03/05/1997
|align=left| Atlantic City, New Jersey, U.S.
|align=left|
|-
|Loss
|17–1–2
|align=left| David Tua
|KO
|1
|20/09/1996
|align=left| Miami, Florida, U.S.
|align=left|
|-
|Win
|17–0–2
|align=left| Rick Sullivan
|UD
|10
|18/07/1996
|align=left| Boston, Massachusetts, U.S.
|align=left|
|-
|Win
|16–0–2
|align=left| Shannon Briggs
|TKO
|3
|15/03/1996
|align=left| Atlantic City, New Jersey, U.S.
|align=left|
|-
|Win
|15–0–2
|align=left| James Stanton
|UD
|10
|12/12/1995
|align=left| Philadelphia, Pennsylvania, U.S.
|align=left|
|-
| Draw
|14–0–2
|align=left| Terry McGroom
|PTS
|10
|17/08/1995
|align=left| Atlantic City, New Jersey, U.S.
|align=left|
|-
|Win
|14–0–1
|align=left| Doug Davis
|PTS
|8
|22/06/1995
|align=left| Atlantic City, New Jersey, U.S.
|align=left|
|-
|Win
|13–0–1
|align=left| Doug Davis
|PTS
|8
|16/05/1995
|align=left| Atlantic City, New Jersey, U.S.
|align=left|
|-
|Win
|12–0–1
|align=left| Luis Rivera
|PTS
|8
|04/04/1995
|align=left| Philadelphia, Pennsylvania, U.S.
|align=left|
|-
|Win
|11–0–1
|align=left| Russell Perry
|TKO
|1
|22/02/1995
|align=left| Philadelphia, Pennsylvania, U.S.
|align=left|
|-
|Win
|10–0–1
|align=left| Rashid Latif
|TKO
|1
|25/01/1995
|align=left| Atlantic City, New Jersey, U.S.
|align=left|
|-
|Win
|9–0–1
|align=left| Dennis Cain
|TKO
|3
|07/12/1994
|align=left| Philadelphia, Pennsylvania, U.S.
|align=left|
|-
|Win
|8–0–1
|align=left| Mike Robinson
|TKO
|2
|22/10/1994
|align=left| Atlantic City, New Jersey, U.S.
|align=left|
|-
|Win
|7–0–1
|align=left| Ron Gullette
|TKO
|2
|19/08/1994
|align=left| Atlantic City, New Jersey, U.S.
|align=left|
|-
|Win
|6–0–1
|align=left| Robert Doyle
|TKO
|1
|28/07/1994
|align=left| Atlantic City, New Jersey, U.S.
|align=left|
|-
|Win
|5–0–1
|align=left| Delen Parsley
|PTS
|4
|07/05/1994
|align=left| Atlantic City, New Jersey, U.S.
|align=left|
|-
| Draw
|4–0–1
|align=left| Levon Warner
|PTS
|4
|01/03/1994
|align=left| Atlantic City, New Jersey, U.S.
|align=left|
|-
|Win
|4–0
|align=left| Randy Gordon
|KO
|1
|01/02/1994
|align=left| Philadelphia, Pennsylvania, U.S.
|align=left|
|-
|Win
|3–0
|align=left| Derrick Minter
|TKO
|1
|02/10/1993
|align=left| Atlantic City, New Jersey, U.S.
|align=left|
|-
|Win
|2–0
|align=left| Mitchell Rose
|TKO
|3
|07/08/1993
|align=left| Atlantic City, New Jersey, U.S.
|align=left|
|-
|Win
|1–0
|align=left| Wayne Perdue
|TKO
|2
|15/05/1993
|align=left| Atlantic City, New Jersey, U.S.
|align=left|

External links
 

Living people
1966 births
American male boxers
Heavyweight boxers
Sportspeople from Danville, Virginia
Boxers from Virginia